Leonid Naumovich Stolovich (July 22, 1929, Leningrad – November 4, 2013, Tartu) was a Russian-Estonian philosopher, Doctor of Philosophy (1966) and professor (1967). Stolovich graduated from the Leningrad University in 1952, from 1953 on he worked at Tartu University, Estonia, from 1994 on as a professor emeritus.
Above all, Stolovich studied esthetics: its history, theories of esthetics and axiology. He is the author of more than forty books and 400 publications in 20 languages.

During the Perestroika era, Stolovich took part in the pro-democracy movement (Popular Front of Estonia). Stolovich’s work “Pluralism in the Philosophy…” decovers 'systematic pluralism', a term coined by Stolovich, which means the unity of dialectical opposites pluralism and monism.

See also 
Philosophy in the Soviet Union

Bibliography 
 Beauty and Society (1969)
 The Essence of Esthetical Quality (1976)
 The Philosophy of Beauty (1980) 
 Esthectics, Art, Play (1992) 
 Life-Creation-Man: the Function of the Creative Activities (1985) (Жизнь. Творчество. Человек: функции художественной деятельности)
 Beauty.Goodness.Truth. A Study on the History of the Esthetical Axiology (Moscow, 1994) (Красота. Добро. Истина. Очерк истории эстетической аксиологии) 
 Pluralism in the Philosophy and the Philosophy of Pluralism (2005)

References

 Eesti Entsüklopeedia, VIII kd, sub Stolovitš

External links 
 “Anecdote and Myth” by L.Stolovitsh (in Russian)
 An interview with Stolovitsh (in Estonian)

20th-century Estonian philosophers
Jewish philosophers
Russian philosophers
Philosophers of art
Academic staff of the University of Tartu
Russian Jews
Estonian Jews
Estonian people of Russian descent
Sportspeople from Saint Petersburg
1929 births
2013 deaths